The Reminder is the third studio album by Canadian singer-songwriter Feist. It was released on April 23, 2007 in countries outside of North America, and May 1, 2007 in the United States and Canada.

Following its release, it debuted on the US Billboard 200 at number 16, selling about 31,000 copies in its first week, and debuted at number 2 in Canada, selling just over 18,000 copies. As of July 25, 2011, the album has sold 729,000 copies in the US. The Reminder was also the best-selling album of 2007 on the iTunes Store.

On November 25, 2008, a deluxe edition of the album was released as a two-disc package featuring nine bonus tracks on the second disc.

Composition
Track 6 of the album, "Sealion", is an adaptation of a song by singer Nina Simone (Broadway-Blues-Ballads, 1964). The original title was "See Line Woman" (a reference to sealions was never intended), and refers to the life of an upper-class sex worker.

Promotion
The Reminder was supported by four singles: "My Moon My Man", "1234", "I Feel It All", and "Honey Honey".  The "My Moon My Man" single includes a remix by German electronic musician Boys Noize. Videos were directed by Patrick Daughters, who also directed the video for "Mushaboom".

During September 2007, the song "1234" was featured in Apple's television advertisement for the third-generation iPod Nano. The advert caused a sudden increase in the song's popularity, which resulted in a surge in the song's chart position.  It reached number 8 in the UK Singles Chart on October 7 and number 8 in the Billboard Hot 100 for the week ending October 13. The music video was shot in a single unbroken take after two days of rehearsals.

eBay also used the song in Australian advertisements. Another single, "My Moon My Man", was used in a Verizon Wireless commercial.

Critical reception

This album was No. 35 on Rolling Stones list of the Top 50 Albums of 2007.

On July 10, 2007, the shortlist for the Polaris Music Prize was revealed. The Reminder was announced as a finalist, alongside such other acts as The Besnard Lakes, Chad VanGaalen, and eventual winner Patrick Watson.

Kelefa Sanneh of The New York Times ranked The Reminder at #1, and Jon Pareles ranked it at No. 2 on list of the 10 Best Albums of 2007.

Time magazine named "1234" one of The 10 Best Songs of 2007, ranking it at #2.  The song was written by Australian artist Sally Seltmann (a.k.a. New Buffalo).  Writer Josh Tyrangiel called the song a “masterpiece”, praising Feist for singing it "with a mixture of wisdom and exuberance that's all her own." 

Less than a year after its release, Blender listed the album 80th on their list of The 100 Greatest Indie-Rock Albums Ever. Online music magazine Pitchfork placed The Reminder at number 112 on their list of top 200 albums of the 2000s.

Feist won the 2007 Shortlist Music Prize for The Reminder; she is the second woman (after Cat Power) to ever win the award.

It won Juno Awards in 2008 for Pop Album of the Year and for Album of the Year. After winning her 5 Junos, in Canada her album sales shot back up the chart from No. 12 to No. 2, the position her album debuted at. It was also nominated for Best Pop Vocal Album at the 50th Grammy Awards.

Track listing

 "Sealion" contains elements from "Sea Lion Woman" by George Bass and Nina Simone.

UK bonus track
 "Honey Honey" (Live at Toronto's Danforth Music Hall) – 4:37

Japanese bonus tracks
 "Intuition" (Live at Toronto's Danforth Music Hall) – 6:14
 "My Moon My Man" (video) – 3:41
 "1234" (video) – 3:14

iTunes Store bonus tracks
"Sealion" (Feist, Bass, Simone) (Chromeo remix) – 3:45
"The Water" (Red demos) – 4:13

Best Buy bonus tracks
"Honey Honey" (live with fade out) – 4:34
"Intuition" (live with fade out) – 6:14
"Fighting Away the Tears" (with Mocky) – 3:17

Deluxe edition second disc bonus tracks
"I Feel It All" (Escort Remix)
"Sealion" (Chromeo Remix)
"My Moon My Man" (Boys Noize Classic Mix)
"1234" (Van She Remix)
"Fightin' Away the Tears" [with Mocky]
"So Sorry" (One Mic Mix)
"My Moon My Man" (Grizzly Bear Remix)
Broken Social Scene: "Lover's Spit" (Redux)
"Islands in the Stream" (with The Constantines)
"My Moon My Man" [video]
"1234" (Director's Cut) [video]
"I Feel It All" [video]
"Honey Honey" [video]

Singles
Physical Singles
"My Moon My Man"
"1234"
"I Feel It All"

Digital Downloads
"My Moon My Man"
"1234"
"I Feel It All"
"Sea Lion Woman"

Charts

Weekly charts

Year-end charts

Certifications and sales

!scope="row"|Worldwide
|
|1,500,000 
|-

Personnel
(Expressions in italics taken from the album credits)
Feist – vocals, acoustic and electric guitars, banjo, piano on "The Water"
Chilly Gonzales – piano, organs, vibraphone, drums
Jesse Baird – drums
Mocky – acoustic bass, Farfisa, organ
Bryden Baird – trumpet, flugelhorn, percussion
Julian Brown – electric bass, melodica
Jamie Lidell – energy arrangement and vocals on "So Sorry"
Town Hall (Jamie Lidell, Julian Brown, Bryden Baird, Mocky, Jesse Baird, Chilly Gonzales and Feist) – group percussion and backup vocals

Guests
Ohad Benchetrit – the mystery on the bridge of "My Moon My Man"
Charles Spearin – the mystery on the bridge of "My Moon My Man"
Afie Jurvanen – leader of the lead guitars on the bridge of "Sealion"
Sandra Baron – violin on "The Limit to Your Love" and "1234"
Mary Stein – cello on "The Limit to Your Love" and "1234"
Ben Mink – strings and acoustic rhythm guitar on "1234"
Kevin Drew – backing vocals on "Honey Honey"
Brendan Canning – backing vocals on "Honey Honey"
Pierre Luc Jamain – organ bass on "Honey Honey"
Lori Gemmel – harp on "Honey Honey"
Eirik Glambek Bøe – vocals on "How My Heart Behaves"

References

2007 albums
Feist (singer) albums
Arts & Crafts Productions albums
Polydor Records albums
Juno Award for Album of the Year albums
Juno Award for Pop Album of the Year albums